Trial Kennedy were an Australian rock band formed in 2002, in Melbourne, Victoria. The band released two albums, both peaked in the Australian top 50. In 2012, the band announced their break-up.

History

2002–2006: Early EPs
Trial Kennedy formed in 2002,

Trial Kennedy's first release was an independent extended play (EP), Present for a Day, recorded, engineered and produced by producer Kalju Tonuma. It was released in 2004.

In 2006's, Trial Kennedy released the EP Picture Frame, also produced by Tonuma.

2007–2012: New Manic Art and Living Undesigned
Trial Kennedy released their debut studio album, New Manic Art, on 31 May 2008. The album was produced by Nick DiDia and it debuted at number 24 on the ARIA Charts. Singles "Neighbours" and "Colour Day Tours" were instant Triple J anthems.

In September 2010 the band began work on recording their second album at Sing Sing Recording Studios in Melbourne with producer Eric J.

The first song from the second album, titled "Strange Behaviour" was released on 10 November 2010. Australian youth radio station Triple J played this song on high rotation over the summer of 2010/2011. "Best of Tomorrow" was released on 4 March 2011. Living Undesigned was released on 13 May 2011 and peaked at number 48 on the ARIA Charts. Beat Magazine said the album is "powerful [with] fun rock album: dynamic, varied and full of energetic and catchy tunes."

On 16 April 2012, the band announced via Facebook that "For a number of reasons all of us in the band have chosen to close down the project that is Trial Kennedy." The band announced their final tour dates for June 2012 with supports including Foreshadowed, My Echo and Sendfire. Their last gig was at The Corner Hotel, Melbourne, on 23 June 2012.

2013: Post-split activities
In April 2013, Tim auditioned for Season 2 of The Voice (Australia) and after successfully having two judges turn their chair he chose Delta Goodrem as his coach. He successfully defeated Oscar Chavesz in the Battle Rounds. He then progressed through the Showdown Rounds as one of the final four members of Goodrem's team left in the competition.

In November 2017, the band announced a live performance for 26 May 2018, to celebrate the ten-year anniversary of the release of New Manic Art.

Discography

Studio albums

Extended plays

Singles

Awards and nominations

AIR Awards
The Australian Independent Record Awards (commonly known informally as AIR Awards) is an annual awards night to recognise, promote and celebrate the success of Australia's Independent Music sector.

|-
| AIR Awards of 2011
| Living Undesigned
| Best Independent Hard Rock/Punk Album
| 
|-

References

Australian indie rock groups
Victoria (Australia) musical groups
Musical groups established in 2002
Musical groups disestablished in 2012